Vi arme syndere (Us Petty Sinners) is a 1952 Danish comedy film directed by Erik Balling and Ole Palsbo.

Cast
Ib Schønberg as Hannibal Svane
Johannes Meyer as Gulbæk
Ellen Gottschalch as Baronessen
Astrid Villaume as Ulla Blom
Bendt Rothe as Maler Astrup
Gunnar Lauring as Kurt Lönning
Freddy Koch as Baron Willy von Ehrenburg
Knud Heglund as Truelsen
Minna Jørgensen as Fru. Riise
Berit Erbe as Tove
Lise Ringheim as Jenny
Per Buckhøj
Einar Juhl
Thorkil Lauritzen
Henry Nielsen
Karl Stegger
Keld Markuslund
Alma Olander Dam Willumsen (as Olander Dam Willumsen)
Dirch Passer

External links

Vi arme syndere on Dansk Film Database

1952 films
1952 comedy films
1950s Danish-language films
Danish black-and-white films
Films directed by Erik Balling
Danish comedy films